Fasthosts Internet Ltd is a provider of Internet access and hosting services based in Gloucester, England. The company also operates the domain name registration service UKreg.

Fasthosts was originally started by Andrew Michael, then aged 17, as part of an A-level school project. It became a limited company in 1999, and launched UKreg in 2000. The company specialised in providing services for small businesses, and in 2002 was listed as the second fastest growing technology company in the United Kingdom by The Sunday Times. In 2005 the company had a turnover of £20 million and made £5 million profit. The company also became known for hosting lavish staff Christmas parties; an event in 2005 costing £600,000 featured appearances from Jonathan Ross, The Darkness and Boney M.

In 2006 Fasthosts was sold to German Internet service provider United Internet for £61.5 million, netting Michael £46 million for his 75% stake. Michael remained as CEO until 2009, when he left to found Livedrive.

In September 2007, shortly after Alisher Usmanov's investment in Arsenal Football Club, Craig Murray blogged about the character of Usmanov, a Russian multi-billionaire Forbes magazine had identified as the 142nd wealthiest person in the world. He said he named Usmanov, alleging corruption, in two of his "quite highly classified" telegrams to the Foreign Office London in 2002 and 2004 written while Murray was ambassador in Uzbekistan. Usmanov's solicitors, Schillings, requested that Fasthosts delete the material. As a result, the server that hosted Murray's blog was permanently closed by the hosting company on 20 September 2007, an action which resulted in unintended deletion of other sites, including a blog by Boris Johnson.

A hacking incident in 2007 prompted Fasthosts to temporarily shut down customers' websites. The company noticed that its servers had been accessed in October and wrote to customers recommending that they change their passwords; in December after noticing "unusual activity" on some sites it closed down those that had yet to change their passwords until new passwords could be issued by post.

In 2008 Fasthosts acquired reseller Streamline.net, and also launched a reseller hosting service in the United States. Cloud infrastructure service Rise was launched in 2010. Fasthosts was the sponsor of The Great Exhibition 2012. In October 2014 Rise was quietly divested to Outsourcery for an undisclosed sum  As of 2017, Fasthosts has approximately  415,000 customer contracts spread over a  variety of products from domain registrations to email, web hosting and server products.

References

External links 
 Fasthosts

Internet service providers of the United Kingdom
Telecommunications companies established in 1999
Companies based in Gloucester
1999 establishments in England